DYDY-TV, channel 2, is a relay television station of Philippine-government owned television network People's Television Network. Its transmitter is located at Brgy. San Miguel, Jordan, Guimaras.

History
1972 - DYDY-TV channel 2 was launched by Kanlaon Broadcasting System.
1975 - KBS was formally re-launched as RPN, the acronym for its franchise name, Radio Philippines Network.
1995 - DYDY-TV channel 2 became an owned-and-operated station of the People's Television Network, Inc. (PTNI).
July 16, 2001 - Under the new management appointed by President Gloria Macapagal Arroyo, PTNI adopted the name National Broadcasting Network (NBN) carrying new slogan "One People. One Nation. One Vision." for a new image in line with its new programming thrusts, they continued the new name until the Aquino administration in 2010.
2011 - After it was lasted for sixteen years in Iloilo, the station suddenly went off the air needed to upgrade its facilities.
October 2015 - PTV-2 Iloilo resumes its relay (satellite-selling) operation, with the 5,000-watt brand new transmitter is located at Barangay San Miguel, Jordan, Guimaras, shortly after 4 years of being off air.
May 13, 2021 - PTV 2 Iloilo started digital test broadcasts on UHF Channel 23.

Digital television

Digital channels

UHF Channel 23 (527.143 MHz)

Areas of coverage

Primary areas  
 Iloilo
 Guimaras

Secondary areas 
 Bacolod
 Portion of Negros Occidental

See also
People's Television Network
List of People's Television Network stations and channels
DWGT-TV - the network's flagship station in Manila.

References

Television channels and stations established in 1972
Television stations in Iloilo City
People's Television Network stations
Digital television stations in the Philippines